Kang Ji-hyun (born February 12, 1992), known professionally as Soyou, is a South Korean singer. She is best known as a former member of the South Korean girl group Sistar.

Life and career

1992–2010: Early life and career beginnings
Soyou was born on February 12, 1992, in Jeju Island, South Korea. Before debuting, she was a licensed hairdresser and worked in a hair salon. Soyou was known as a Cube Entertainment trainee, who was originally supposed to debut as a member of 4Minute. Soyou has said that she didn't make it into the group because she was lacking in many ways and was originally supposed to be in Sohyun's place.  Instead, Soyou auditioned for Starship Entertainment, singing a cover of Navi's "On The Road", and after her traineeship, she debuted as a member of Sistar in June 2010. The group gained significant popularity after the release of their hit single "So Cool" in 2011.

2010–2017: Original soundtracks, collaborations and Sistar disbandment 

In August 2010, Soyou collaborated with Kan Jongwoo of J2 for the soundtrack for the drama Gloria. In September, she also sang a soundtrack for MBC's drama Playful Kiss. The song is titled "Should I Confess".

In November 2012, Soyou sang a duet with hip-hop duo Geeks. The song "Officially Missing You, Too" is a remake of Tamia's song of the same title. It is a part of Geeks' project album, Re;Code Episode 1. She also collaborated with fellow label mates, K.Will and Boyfriend's Jeongmin, for Starship Planet's yearly holiday release, titled "White Love".

In September 2013, it was revealed that Soyou and Mad Clown would release a duet called "Stupid in Love" on the 10th.

In February 2014, Soyou and Junggigo released a duet called "Some".

In January 2015, it was revealed that Soyou, together with Lee Honey and Kim Jungmin, would be the new MCs of beauty tip program Get It Beauty. The new MCs' first episode aired on February 4, 2015.

In February 2017, Soyou and Baekhyun released a duet called "Rain".

In May 2017, Sistar released their last single "Lonely". The group performed their most successful summer hits – "Touch My Body", "Shake It", "Loving U", "I Swear" and also their last song "Lonely" on four major music shows, before concluding the schedule on Inkigayo on June 4, 2017 and officially disbanding.

In August 2017, Soyou was featured as the vocalist on Primary's song "Right?".

2017–present: Solo debut 

After Sistar disbanded in June 2017, Soyou debuted her solo career under Starship Entertainment. She was featured on K.Will's fourth album Part.1 Nonfiction, for the B-side track titled "Let Me Hear You Say", released on September 26. She released a collaboration track titled "Monitor Girl" with Geeks' Louie on October 26, it was their second collaboration since "Officially Missing You, Too" in 2012. On November 16, Soyou released "I Still" with Sung Si-kyung as pre-release track for her upcoming solo album. On November 28, Soyou was confirmed to become an MC for a new beauty program of JTBC titled SoyouXHani's Beauty View, which began airing on December 28. On December 13, Soyou released the first part of her solo album titled Re:Born with the single "The Night" featuring rapper duo Geeks and produced by Primary.

A year and nine months after her last release, Soyou released "Gotta Go" on June 28, 2020. The song is a reggaeton, dance hall style song and was accompanied by a music video, released through Starship Entertainment's YouTube channel.

After eight months, Starship Entertainment announced that Soyou is gearing up for her next comeback on March 11, 2021. Soyou's new single "Good Night My Love" was reportedly written by Lee Hyori and composed by Babylon.

On September 8, Soyou decided not to renew her contract with Starship Entertainment.  Later on September 29, Soyou signed with BPM Entertainment.

On March 1, 2022, BPM Entertainment announced Soyou will hold her first solo concert 'THE LIVE: NIGHT' on April 2 and 3. On April 27, 2022, Soyou released her third EP, Day & Night, with the lead single "Business", featuring Be'O.

Philanthropy 
On November 21, 2022, Soyou donated a total of  million in scholarships to twenty underprivileged university students in Seoul through the Korean Red Cross Society for which Soyou acts as a public relations ambassador.

Discography

Extended plays

Singles

As lead artist

As featured artist

Collaboration singles

Soundtrack appearances

Compilation appearances

Filmography

Television shows

Web shows

Videography

Music videos

Concert and tours

Concert

Awards and nominations

Notes

References

External links 

 

Sistar members
Starship Entertainment artists
BPM Entertainment artists
1992 births
Living people
People from Jeju Province
South Korean female idols
South Korean women pop singers
South Korean television personalities
Korean Music Award winners
Melon Music Award winners
Sungshin Women's University alumni